Women's Studies in Communication is a feminist journal. It was first published in 1977 and is the journal of the Organization for Research on Women and Communication. It is published by Taylor & Francis. From 2014 until 2017, Joan Faber McAlister worked as the journal's editor-in-chief. As of 2022, the editor is Claire Sisco King of Vanderbilt University.  The journal covers topics including gender and race, ethnicity, nationality, sexuality, and class.

References

External links 
Official website

Triannual journals
Feminist journals
English-language journals